The Round Barn Theatre is a non-Equity regional theatre located in Nappanee, Indiana. It is part of The Barns at Nappanee, Home of Amish Acres, a historic farm and heritage resort. The Barns at Nappanee, Home of Amish Acres is owned by Marlin and Christy Stutzman The Stutzman's are the producers of The Round Barn Theatre. The building is a round barn built in 1911 that was dismantled and relocated at the farm in 1998. It was moved  from its original location. To meet state building codes a thirty-two ton six-inch (152 mm)  tubular steel frame was erected and the original studs, compression rings, rafters, and cupola were reassembled attached to the frame. The barn is sixty feet in diameter and stands sixty feet tall to the top of the cupola. Insulation is sandwiched between new barn siding inside and outside the frame. A post and beam straw shed that was added to the structure shortly after its construction was also moved intact to become the proscenium stage for the theatre. Robert Holdeman, AIA, of Traverse City, Michigan designed the plans that converted the barn into a state of the art performing arts center. Ninety-six dimmer circuits provide theatre lighting and a sound system using Audiotechnica cordless microphones provide the required tools for the lighting and sound designers. The stage is outfitted with a counterweight fly system. The orchestra is housed in a loft open to the audience. The seating capacity in the orchestra, mezzanine, and balcony is four hundred.

Programming at The Round Barn Theatre 
The Round Barn Theatre offers a 45 week season that is filled with 5-6 Broadway style musicals. Examples include Hunchback of Notre Dame, Into the Woods, Disney's Beauty and the Beast, and more. Each season, RBT employs over 50 artists to successfully execute the theatrical season. Audience members can expect to see performers from all around the country who temporarily make Nappanee their home to work with RBT.

Lux Theatre Group at RBT 
Lux Theatre Group, formally Legacy Theatre Group, is the producing company who makes The Round Barn Theatre their home. Specializing in brand new musicals, Lux Theatre Group has produced world premiere productions including, A Musical Christmas Carol, Land That I Love, and the Hallmark Channel and Janette Oke favorite When Calls the Heart The Musical which premieres in 2021. The Lux Theatre Group is founded by Christy Stutzman who serves as the Composer writing the music and lyrics. John Coates orchestrates, and Bethany Crawford pens the scripts.

The Round Barn Theatre Academy 
Founded in 2020 by RBT Executive Director Christy Stutzman and RBT Operations Manager Alex Price, the RBT Academy harnesses the power of the fine arts to develop good character and creativity in people of all ages and provides quality theatre experiences and arts training to bring families and communities together. Offering classes in the winter and fall, students can enroll in a variety of theatre classes covering acting, singing, dancing, and design/tech. Summer camps are also offered in the summer to give students a chance to perform on The Round Barn Stage.

External links 
 The Barns at Nappanee, Home of Amish Acres
The Round Barn Theatre

Theatres in Indiana
Buildings and structures in Elkhart County, Indiana
Barn theatres